The 4477th Test and Evaluation Squadron (4477 TES) was a squadron in the United States Air Force under the claimancy of the Tactical Air Command (TAC).  It is currently inactive. The product of Project Constant Peg, the unit was created to expose the tactical air forces to the flight characteristics of fighter aircraft used by the Soviet Union during the Cold War. The declassified history of the squadron shows that it operated MiG-17s, MiG-21s and MiG-23s between 1977 and 1988, but it was not formally disbanded until July 1990.

The mission of Constant Peg was to train Air Force, United States Navy and United States Marine Corps pilots and weapon systems officers, in air combat tactics against these foreign aircraft and was instrumental in the re-development of dissimilar air combat training (DACT) methods developed after the Vietnam War. Today's USAF aggressor training squadrons can symbolically trace their histories back to the 4477th, as well as the paint motifs on their aircraft, which were used by the aircraft of the squadron in the 1970s and 1980s.

History
The longest continuing United States classified military airplane program is the testing and evaluation of Foreign Aircraft Technology.  During the Cold War, secret test flying of Mikoyan-and-Gurevich Design Bureau (MiG) and other Soviet aircraft was an ongoing mission dating back to the acquisition of the first Soviet-built Yakovlev Yak-23 in 1953.  This effort has continued to the present day. Unlike the other "black" airplane programs, such as the Have Blue, Lockheed U-2, or Lockheed SR-71 Blackbird, Foreign Aircraft Technology operations still remain classified.  Despite the declassification of the Constant Peg program in 2006, the evaluation of foreign aircraft likely continues.

It is not known exactly the actual number or types of aircraft involved, where they came from, or the complete history of the program. It is estimated that in 1985 the USAF had 26 MiGs (MiG-21s and MiG-23s as MiG-17s had already been phased out) and by the end of the program USAF had mainly MiG-21s.

It is known that the activities of the 4477th Test and Evaluation Squadron brought about a fundamental change in United States Air Force and United States Navy / United States Marine Corps air combat tactics. They revitalized the art of dogfighting at a time when it had seemingly been nearly forgotten. The knowledge gained from testing the aircraft the squadron flew was reflected in the success of United States air operations during the Vietnam War, as well as the founding of the Air Force's Red Flag program and the United States Navy's TOPGUN school.

Origins

In the 1950s in the United States, with the development of air-to-air missiles, such as AIM-4 Falcon, AIM-7 Sparrow III, and AIM-9 Sidewinder, the paradigm for the new generation of jet fighters was that dog-fighting was obsolete. The U.S. Navy's F4H Phantom II (later redesignated F-4) was the first fighter designed from the start without cannon. The air-to-air training given to new Navy and Marine Corps F-4 crews was extremely limited. It involved about ten flights and provided little useful information. By 1964, few in the Navy and Marine Corps were left to carry on the tradition of classic dogfighting.

Then came the Vietnam War. The early years showed the faith placed in missiles was terribly in error. Between 1965 and the bombing halt in 1968, the USAF had a 2.15 to 1 kill ratio. The U.S. Navy was doing slightly better with a 2.75 to 1 rate. For roughly every two North Vietnamese Mikoyan-Gurevich MiG-17s or MiG-21s shot down, an American F-4 Phantom II, F-105 Thunderchief, or F-8 Crusader would be lost. Crucially, the percentage of United States fighters being lost in air-to-air combat was growing. During 1966, only 3 percent of U.S. aircraft were lost to MiGs. This rose to 8 percent in 1967, then climbed to 22 percent for the first three months of 1968.

The emphasis on air-to-air missile interception meant the fighter combat crews had only the sketchiest knowledge of dogfighting. Originally conceived as a naval fleet air defense aircraft, and later adapted as an Air Force fighter-bomber, the design of the F-4 made it ill-suited for a tight-turning dogfight. In contrast to the lighter MiG-17, the F-4 was large and heavy. When a tight turn was made, the F-4 would lose energy and airspeed. The MiG-17's superior turning capability then allowed it to close to gun range. All too often, hits from the MiG-17's "outmoded" cannons would then destroy the F-4.

Under the HAVE DOUGHNUT and HAVE DRILL programs, the first MiGs flown in the United States, were used to evaluate the aircraft in performance and technical capabilities, as well as in operational capability, pitting the types against U.S. fighters.

Data from the HAVE DOUGHNUT and HAVE DRILL tests were provided to the newly formed United States Navy Fighter Weapons School (TOPGUN) at NAS Miramar, California. During the remainder of the Vietnam War, the Navy kill ratio climbed to 8.33 to 1. In contrast, the Air Force rate improved only slightly to 2.83 to 1. The reason for this difference was TOPGUN. The Navy (including the Marine Corps) had revitalized its air combat training, while the Air Force had stayed stagnant. Most of the Navy MiG kills were by TOPGUN graduates.

By 1970, the HAVE DRILL program was expanded; a few selected fleet F-4 crews were given the chance to fight the MiGs. The most important result of HAVE DRILL is that no Navy pilot who flew in the project defeated the MiG-17 in the first engagement. The HAVE DRILL dogfights were by invitation only. The other pilots based at Nellis Air Force Base were not to know about the U.S.-operated MiGs. To prevent any sightings, the airspace above the Groom Lake portion of the Nellis Range was closed. On aeronautical maps, the exercise area was marked in red ink. The forbidden zone became known as "Red Square".

The idea of a more realistic training program for the Air Force was devised by USAF Colonel Gail Peck, a Vietnam veteran F-4 pilot, who was dissatisfied with his service's fighter pilot training. After the war, he worked at the Department of Defense, where he heard about the HAVE DRILL and HAVE DOUGHNUT programs. He won the support of USAF General Hoyt S. Vandenberg, Jr. and launched "Constant Peg," named after Vandenberg's callsign, "Constant," and Peck's wife, Peg.

MiGs acquisitions

Tactical Air Command (TAC) established the 4477th Test and Evaluation Flight as the formal USAF testing unit on 1 April 1977. It began with three MiGs: two MiG-17Fs and a MiG-21 loaned by Israel, who had captured them from the Syrian Air Force and Iraqi Air Force. Later, it added MiG-21s from the Indonesian Air Force and other sources.

In the late 1960s, the MiG-17 and MiG-21F were still frontline aircraft. 
 A few Algerian MiG 21F-13s and MiG-17s were delivered via Israel as the result of pilot error. 
 Morocco sold some stored MiG-17s.
 In 1990 Luftwaffe sold to USAF 12 MiG-23ML, 2 MiG-23BN, 2 Su-22M4 and 1 MiG-29.
 Clandestine procurement of MiG-17, MiG-19 and MiG-21, all in operating condition but stored, was negotiated in the end of 1960s with Indonesia. The USAF offered $250,000 for each plane, as previously when MiG planes had been received from Korea, Pakistan, Cambodia and Israel. Additional MiGs were desired for testing and eventually the creation of a MiG mock training squadron. In the early 1970s Indonesia sold 10 MiG-21F-13, 1 MiG-21U and 2 PZL-Mielec Lim-5P (a Polish MiG 17 variant). In the mid 1970s 16 Northrop F-5E/F Tiger II were delivered to Indonesia in exchange for those stored MiG-21s which ended up in 4477th Squadron.

MiGs were acquired from scrapyards, dug out of remote places where they’d crashed, recovered from warehouses where they had been left or just bought from other air forces. CIA clandestine purchase sources in Poland and Romania may have supplied MiG spare parts. Mig-19s were tested in the HAVE BOAT program, but were not assigned to 4477th. Finland, Yugoslavia, Algeria and India could have been contacted for assistance in MiG-21 maintenance.

By the late 1970s, United States MiG operations were undergoing another change. After a decade, purchased MiGs had been superseded by later-model MiG-21s and new MiG-23 fighters. Fortunately, a new source of supply of Soviet aircraft became available in Egypt and Somalia. In the mid-1970s, relations between Egypt and the Soviet Union had become strained, and Soviet advisers were ordered out. The Soviets had provided the Egyptian air force with MiGs since the mid-1950s. Before breaking up with Soviet Union, Egypt had received MiG-23 fighters and modern MiG-21 fighters and Soviet advisers taught Egyptian pilots how to use them against Israeli F-4 Phantoms. With their traditional source out of the picture, the Egyptians began looking West to keep their MiGs in service. They turned to United States companies for parts to support their late-model MiG-21s and MiG-23s. Very soon, a deal was made with the USAF. Egyptian president Anwar Sadat is believed to have sold 12 MiG-23MS Flogger E interceptors and one MiG-23BN Flogger F fighter-bomber in 1977. Egypt may have included in the deal MiG-21MFs together with the Mig-23s. The USAF supplied 36 F-4Es in exchange. The two MiG-23 variants were assigned to secret test programs HAVE PAD and HAVE BOXER. The Egyptian planes were disassembled and shipped from Egypt to Edwards Air Force Base. They were then transferred initially to Groom Lake for reassembly and study.

In November 1980, the first MiG-23 was flown by the 4477th at Tonopah when the first MiG-23BN Flogger F was received after Area 51 tests ended. Other MiG-23s were received many years later from ex-East German stocks. Germany is believed to have sold 12 MiG-23ML, 2 MiG-23BN, 2 Su-22M4 and 1 MiG-29.

In 1987, the USAF bought 12 new Shenyang F-7Bs from China for use in the Constant Peg program. At the same time, it retired the remaining MiG-21F-13 acquired from Indonesia.

Operations
The mission of 4477th squadron was to train U.S. Air Force, U.S. Navy, and U.S. Marine Corps pilots on the best ways to fight and win when encountering MiGs in aerial combat. During the first year 1,015 sorties were done and 372 Air Force and Navy pilots took the MiG experience at Tonopah. Each training course lasted 7 days on average and included 5 mock aerial combats, three MiG-21s and two MiG-23s.

The United States-operated MiGs received special designations due to the practical problem of what to call the aircraft in mission logs and paperwork. This was solved by giving them numbers in the Century Series. The MiG-21s and Shenyang F-7Bs were called the "YF-110" (the original designation for the USAF F-4C), while the MiG-23s were called the "YF-113".

The focus of Air Force Systems Command (AFSC) limited the use of the MiGs as tools with which to understand the performance, capabilities, and qualities of the enemy. By contrast, TAC was interested in training the front line tactical fighter pilots. Air Force Systems Command recruited its MiG pilots from the Air Force Flight Test Center at Edwards Air Force Base, California, who were usually graduates from either the Air Force Test Pilot School at Edwards or the Naval Test Pilot School at NAS Patuxent River, Maryland. TAC selected its MiG pilots primarily from the ranks of the Weapons School and Aggressors at Nellis AFB. Similarly, the US Navy and US Marine Corps pilots were recruited from the instructors of the Navy Fighter Weapons School.

The aircraft were collected at the Department of Energy's Tonopah Test Range, where they were flown by the squadron. The squadron operated MiG-17s until 1982, but mostly MiG-21s and MiG-23s. When possible, additional Soviet equipment was added to the planes and tested against USAF planes, like a flare dispenser from a Sukhoi Su-25 shot down in Afghanistan. This practice proved to be very important as tests with real Soviet equipment proved several times USAF equipment was designed according to American specifications, different from the Soviet ones, and results against the "real thing" were many times surprisingly different than expected.

The maintainers of the 4477th made miracles to keep the MiGs in service. Considering MiGs were not built to last, no instruction manuals and technical data were available, and, last but not least, as no spare parts or components were easy to get, they did a pretty good job. In best cases MiGs were delivered from unknown sources and were dismantled for spares. In worst cases reverse engineering was needed. Sometimes CIA sources or US manufacturers supplied components.

From 1977 to 1988 the 4477th Squadron flew three models of MiGs. After being active for more than a decade the secret aggressor unit flew their MiGs in more than 15,000 sorties. To minimize risks MiGs never flew in bad weather or at night. The end of Cold War and the high costs of keeping the MiGs in flight condition meant the program was ended in March 1988.

Inventory
They Squadron used MiG-17F, MiG-17PF (Lim-5P), MiG-21F-13 (ex Indonesian), MiG-21MF (ex Egyptian), MiG-23MS (ex Egyptian), MiG-23BN (ex Egyptian) and Chengdu F-7B (bought new in 1987).

First two MiG-17 were ex-Syrian MiG-17F (Have Ferry) and ex-Indonesian Lim-5P. 

One MiG-17F was lost in accident in 1979.

 1979 inventory: 1 x MiG-17F, 1 x Lim-5P (MiG-17PF), 6 x MiG-21F-13.
 1981 inventory: 2 x MiG-17F, 1 x Lim-5P, 6 x MiG-21F-13, 1 MiG-23BN.
 1982 inventory: 6 x MiG-21F-13, 2 x MiG-21MF, 1 x MiG-23BN, 2 x MiG-23MS.
 1983 inventory: 6 x MiG-21F-13, 3 x MiG-21MF, 2 x MiG-23BN, 4 x MiG-23MS.
 1984 inventory: 15 x MiG-21F-13/MF, 4 x MiG-23BN/MS.
 1985 inventory: 17 x MiG-21F-13/MF, 10 x MiG-23BN/MS.
 1986 inventory: 14 x MiG-21F-13/MF, 10 x MiG-23BN/MS.
 1987 inventory: 14 x MiG-21, 10 x MiG-23BN/MS.
 1988 inventory: 14 x MiG-21, 9 x MiG-23BN/MS.

Not all evaluation programs meant planes were later transferred to Red Hats Squadron.

 Have Doughnut: Iraqui MiG-21F-13 and Algerian MMiG-21F-13, 1968. Transferred as YF-110B.
 Have Drill: Syrian Lim-5 (MiG-17F), 1969. Transferred as YF-113A.
 Have Ferry: Syrian MiG-17F, 1969. Transferred as YF-114C.
 Have Privilege: Cambodian MiG-17 (Shenyang F-5), 1970. Transferred as YF-113C.
 Have Boat: PLAAF MiG-19 (Shenyang JZ-6), 1977.
 Have Up: Egyptian Su-20, 1977.
 Have Pad: Egyptian MiG-23MS, 1978. Transferred as YF-113E.
 Have Boxer: Egyptian MiG-23BN, 1978. Transferred as YF-113B.
 Have Coat: Egyptian MiG-21MF, 1980. Transferred as YF-110D.
 Have Track: Somalian MiG-21s.
 Have Loan: East Germany MiG-29, 1990. Transferred as YF-116A.

Aggressor training
The lackluster performance of USAF fighter pilots in Vietnam was studied by the United States Air Force Fighter Weapons School at Nellis AFB, Nevada, during the early 1970s. Combat reports showed that the lack of training in flying basic fighter maneuvers was a major cause of the low air-to-air kill rate, as well some technical limitations in the F-4, the primary fighter in use by the Air Force in Vietnam. The 414th Fighter Weapons Squadron, part of the Fighter Weapons School had flown its F-4s against the HAVE FERRY MiG-17F, which was fundamentally different than flying against the F-105 and other United States fighters. It was considered useful to establish a squadron dedicated to Dissimilar air combat training (DACT) employing pilots trained in Soviet fighter tactics, using aircraft with flight characteristics similar to the MiGs that American aircrews would face in combat.  Combat training would change from an F-4 flying against another F-4 to flying against a fundamentally different aircraft, flown by a pilot who would think and fly like a Soviet pilot.

The 64th Fighter Weapons Squadron, equipped with Northrop T-38 Talons was activated in October 1972 as the USAF's first "Aggressor" squadron. Its pilots were trained against the Soviet MiGs at Groom Lake, and would use the T-38s to fly against Tactical Air Command pilots, employing known Soviet fighter tactics against them in air-to-air combat training.  They were also trained to fly against acquired Soviet air defense systems similar to those that US pilots had faced over North Vietnam. The pilots of the 64th were also well-seasoned combat veterans of the Vietnam War, many with Distinguished Flying Crosses and over 100 combat missions over North Vietnam. Beginning in the spring of 1973, the squadron began deploying to TAC bases in the United States to perform DACT training against F-4 pilots.

The training program was successful, and beginning in November 1975, a large-scale exercise "Red Flag 1" was held at Nellis AFB where training was held on a large scale. The acquired Soviet air defense radar was installed at several locations on the Nellis range, and simulated Soviet integrated missile and antiaircraft artillery batteries, similar to what was faced in Vietnam and by Israeli pilots during the 1973 Yom Kippur War were set up. Selected TAC pilots were taken to Groom Lake to train against the HAVE FERRY MiG-17. In the summer of 1975, the 65th Fighter Weapons Squadron was established as the second "Aggressor" squadron.

With the Fall of Saigon, the United States had some 70 F-5E Tiger II fighter aircraft in storage, which were paid for by Congress to send to the Republic of Vietnam Air Force. The T-38s used by the Aggressor squadrons were trainers and similar to the F-5, but were not combat aircraft and were not ideal in the role of simulating the performance of the Soviet MiG, however the higher-performance F-5E was.  When South Vietnam collapsed, the T-38s were replaced by the F-5Es as the "Aggressor" aircraft. The circumstances also allowed the creation of two more Aggressor Squadrons in 1975/1976, the 26th Tactical Fighter Training Squadron at Clark Air Base, Philippines, to train PACAF pilots and the 527th Tactical Fighter Training Aggressor Squadron at RAF Alconbury, England to train USAFE pilots.

Establishment of the 4477th
During the 1970s, the number of acquired Soviet aircraft increased to include more MiG-21s and some MiG-23s. The number of aircraft and the expanded use of the facility at Groom Lake to train new Aggressor pilots was becoming more and more awkward.

It was decided to move the Aggressor training program to a less secure, remote facility. The Tonopah Test Range Airport, only  to the northwest of Groom Lake and on the controlled AEC Tonopah Test Range fitted the need for a new home. The AEC airport had the potential for improvement and expansion, with the only public land overlooking the base miles away. Although not as hidden as Groom Lake, the airport would be remote enough to operate the Soviet aircraft. In fact, the security surrounding the Tonopah Test Range was so effective that the new base was not publicly reported as an Air Force military airfield until 1985. On 1 April 1977 Tactical Air Command established the 4477th Test and Evaluation Flight, which assumed the personnel and equipment of the un-designated testing unit at Groom Lake and moved the program to Tonopah TRA. The unit was officially assigned to Nellis AFB under the 57th Fighter Weapons Wing.

The 4477th pilots and tactical controllers were Aggressors, Fighter Weapons School or Top Gun instructors. Most were majors, a few captains, with 2000–3000 hours. Two pilots of the 4477th died flying the Soviet planes. USAF claims pilots had no manuals for the aircraft, although some tried to write one, nor was there a consistent supply of spare parts, which had to be refurbished or manufactured at high cost or procured from friendly nations.

Students fighting those USAF MiGs were supposed to learn enough to be able to kill a MiG, or at least to survive, in their first real dogfight with a MiG.

4477th TEF/TES Accidents
On 23 August 1979, a pilot lost control of the squadron's MiG-17F, USAF serial 002. U.S. Navy Lieutenant M. Hugh Brown, 31, of the U.S. Navy's Test and Evaluation Squadron FOUR (VX-4), "Bandit 12", originally of Roanoke, Virginia, entered a spin while dogfighting a U.S. Navy F-5. Brown recovered, but entered a second irrecoverable spin too low to eject. The plane hit the ground at a steep angle near the Tonopah Test Range airfield boundary, killing the pilot instantly.

On 21 October 1982, USAF Captain Mark Postai crashed with a MiG-23.

On 26 April 1984, USAF Lieutenant General Robert M. "Bobby" Bond, then vice commander of Air Force Systems Command, died attempting to eject after losing control of his MiG-23 while supersonic. A few hours after the crash, Headquarters, Air Force Systems Command, at Andrews Air Force Base, Maryland, issued a brief statement: "Lt. Gen. Robert M. Bond, vice commander, Air Force Systems Command, was killed today in an accident while flying in an Air Force specially modified test aircraft". Three-star generals do not generally fly test missions, so Bond's death attracted press interest. The fact that the Air Force also refused to identify the type of plane also raised questions. Early reports claimed he had been flying "a super-secret Stealth fighter prototype."  The death of a three-star general led the Air Force to reveal that it was flying Soviet aircraft.F-117A: The crash of General Robert M Bond  A boulevard cut-off between Eglin Air Force Base (main base) and Hurlburt Field in Florida is named in his honor.

End of operations

Near the end of the Cold War the program was ostensibly abandoned and the squadron was disbanded. Flight operations at Tonopah closed down in March 1988, although the 4477th was not inactivated until July 1990, according to one official Air Force history. In the interim, a handful of pilots flew 'continuation training (CT)' sorties at Groom Lake. The decision to shut down operations may have had something to do with the fact that a new generation of Soviet aircraft was entering service and also the inevitable round of budget cuts from Washington.

The assets of the Squadron could not go to the boneyard at Davis–Monthan AFB, and the fate of some of them remain classified.  Several of the F-110s (MiG-21) were sent to museums or now are on static display. Some of the airplanes may have been broken up, and its rumored that some were buried in the Nevada desert. Also a few were used for target practice on Air Force weapons ranges.

Others
4477th inventory
 1980: 1 x MiG-17F, 1 x Lim-5P (MiG-17PF), 6 x MiG-21F-13.
 1981: 2 x MiG-17F, 1 x Lim-5P, 6 x MiG-21F-13, 1 MiG-23BN.
 1982: 6 x MiG-21F-13, 2 x MiG-21MF, 1 x MiG-23BN, 2 x MiG-23MS.
 1983: 6 x MiG-21F-13, 3 x MiG-21MF, 2 x MiG-23BN, 4 x MiG-23MS.
 1984: 15 x MiG-21F-13/MF, 4 x MiG-23BN/MS.
 1985: 17 x MiG-21F-13/MF, 10 x MiG-23BN/MS.
 1986: 14 x MiG-21F-13/MF, 10 x MiG-23BN/MS.
 1987: all MiGs-21F-13 retired and replaced by Chengdu J-7B. 14 x MiG-21, 10 x MiG-23BN/MS.
 1988: 14 x MiG-21, 9 x MiG-23BN/MS.

HAVE programs
These programs analyzed Soviet MiGs.

 Have Boat: Pakistani Shenyang J-6 purchased in 1969 and PLAAF's  Shenyang J-6 defected  to Taiwan in 1977.
 Have Boxer: Egyptian MiG-23BN (YF-113B) bought in 1978.
 Have Coat: Egyptian MiG-21MF (YF-110D) bought in 1980.
 Have Doughnut: Indonesian MiG-21F-13 and Iraqi MiG-21F-13 (YF-110B) bought in 1968.
 Have Drill: Syrian Lim-5 (MiG-17F) (YF-113A) bought in 1969.
 Have Ferry: Syrian MiG-17F (YF-114C) bought in 1969.
 Have Lighter Have Loan: East Germany MiG-29 (YF-116A).
 Have Fireman Have Nose: Recovery operation of 3 Iraqi MiG-29 Fulcrums (in various states of damage).
 Have Pad: Egyptian MiG-23MS (YF-113E) bought in 1978.
 Have Privilege: Shenyang F-5 (YF-113C) borrowed from Cambodia in November 1970.
 Have Track: Training program involving mock fights with Somali pilots and their MiG-21s.
 Have Up'': Egyptian Su-20 bought in 1977.

Ongoing foreign technology evaluation
After the 4477 TES was inactivated, the remaining assets were reconstituted as a detachment of the 57th Fighter Wing at Nellis AFB, now known as Detachment 3, 53rd Test and Evaluation Group.

Anecdotal evidence suggests that exploitation of foreign aircraft today has returned to the original hierarchy seen in the 1960s and 1970s when HAVE IDEA became the umbrella program for exploiting foreign tactical fighters: the 'assets' are exploited first for performance, materials and qualities by Air Force Materiel Command (the successor to AFSC), before Air Force Combat Command (the successor to TAC) is then given access to the aircraft for tactical exploitation.

There have been multiple sightings of foreign aircraft over Nevada since the end of Constant Peg and the inactivation of the 4477th TES: In a March 1994 article on Groom Lake in Popular Science, a photo was published of an Su-22 fighter in flight. The plane was painted in a green and tan finish. The Su-22 is a swing-wing, light-attack aircraft. It was in frontline Russian Air Force service at the time and was exported widely to Eastern European and Third World countries during the 1970s and 1980s.

Also in 1993, the United States and Germany trained with former East German MiG-23s and two Su-22s which were sent to the United States. With East and West Germany now unified, there was an ample supply of both Soviet-built planes and the spare parts needed to support them. In October 1994, Aerospace Daily reported that "reliable observers" had sighted an Su-27 Flanker on two occasions. The Su-27 is a Russian first-line advanced interceptor. It is in operation with both the Russia and People's Republic of China air forces.

In 2014, it is believed that Air Combat Command (ACC) shares access to Mikoyan MiG-29s and Su-27 aircraft somewhere in Nevada (most likely Groom Lake) flying against Fighter Weapons School instructors, 422d Test and Evaluation Squadron aircrews and F-15 Eagle and F-16 Fighting Falcon "Aggressor" aircraft flying from Nellis AFB.

Lineage
 Established by Tactical Air Command as 4477th Test and Evaluation Flight and activated, 1 April 1977
 Status changed to Squadron and re-designated:  4477th Test and Evaluation Squadron, 1 May 1980
 Inactivated on 15 July 1990

Assignments
 57th Tactical Training Wing, 1 April 1977
 Re-designated: 57th Fighter Weapons Wing, 1 March 1980 – 15 July 1990

Stations
 Nellis Air Force Base, Nevada, 1 April 1977 – 15 July 1990
 Operationally located at: Tonopah Test Range Airport, Nevada, entire period

Aircraft
As an operations security measure, the Soviet aircraft had their own US aircraft designations in order to avoid using the actual Soviet designations.

 YF-110B Soviet MiG-21F-13
 YF-110C Chinese Chengdu J-7B (MiG-21F-13 variant)
 YF-110D Soviet MiG-21MF
 YF-113B Soviet MiG-23BN
 YF-113E Soviet MiG-23MS NATO:"Flogger-E"
 YF-114C Soviet MiG-17F
 YF-114D Soviet MiG-17PF
 Northrop T-38/F-5E/F Tiger II Used as a chase/DACT training planes

References

 Media Advisory: AF Declassifies Elite Aggressor Program, 13 November 2006

Tactical evaluation squadrons of the United States Air Force
Nye County, Nevada
Military units and formations in Nevada
Military units and formations established in 1980
Military units and formations disestablished in 1990
MAJCOM squadrons of the United States Air Force
Espionage techniques
Military deception
Special forces